Beilschmiedia micranthopsis  is an Asian tree species in the family Lauraceae.  Records of occurrence are from Vietnam, where it may be called két hoa nhỏ; no subspecies are listed in the Catalogue of Life.

References 

Flora of Indo-China
Trees of Vietnam
micranthopsis